The 2018 NRL Women's Premiership (NRLW) was the first season of professional women's rugby league in Australia.

Teams

Pre-season 
Only two of the four sides, the Brisbane Broncos and New Zealand Warriors, took part in pre-season trial games. The Warriors played two fixtures against a combined Auckland side, while the Broncos played the Papua New Guinea Orchids as a curtain-raiser to the Brisbane Broncos-Manly Sea Eagles NRL fixture. The Sydney Roosters were due to play the North Sydney Bears but the game was cancelled due to player availability. They instead underwent an opposed session with the Roosters' under-20 Jersey Flegg Cup side.

Regular season 

The inaugural season will operate under a round-robin format, with games played as curtain-raisers to the 2018 NRL Finals Series. The top two finishing teams will then contest the Grand Final, which is to be played before the men's Grand Final on 30 September.

Round 1

Round 2

Round 3

Ladder

Ladder progression 
Numbers highlighted in green indicate that the team finished the round inside the top two.
Numbers highlighted in blue indicates the team finished first on the ladder in that round.
Numbers highlighted in red indicates the team finished last place on the ladder in that round.

Grand Final

References

External links